Beta-carotene isomerase (DWARF27 (gene)) is an enzyme with systematic name beta-carotene 9-cis-all-trans isomerase. This enzyme catalyses the following chemical reaction

 all-trans-beta-carotene  9-cis-beta-carotene

The enzyme participates in a pathway leading to biosynthesis of strigolactones.

References

External links 
 

EC 5.2.1